Doina Stăiculescu (born 7 December 1967) is a Romanian individual rhythmic gymnast. She won a silver medal at the 1984 Olympics, when rhythmic gymnastics was introduced as an Olympic event.

Career 
Stăiculescu was a three time national champion and had her highest placement at the 1983 World Championships by finishing 6th in All-around and qualifying for ball, clubs and ribbon finals.

At the time of rhythmic gymnastics being officially added as an Olympic Sport at the 1984 Olympic Games in Los Angeles, the gymnasts from USSR and Bulgaria were considered the favourites to win, but the Eastern led Boycott of the 1984 Summer Olympics left Stăiculescu the highest rank gymnast to compete in the Olympic event. Canadian gymnast, Lori Fung (ranked 23rd in the world at the time), trained with Stăiculescu ahead of the games. Despite finishing first in qualification, Stăiculescu finished in second place in the final to win the silver medal, having been beaten to the first Olympic gold medal in rhythmic gymnastics by Fung. She is the only Romanian to win a medal in Rhythmic Gymnastics.

Stăiculescu is now working as a gymnastics coach at a private school in Romania.

References

External links

 
 
 
 

1967 births
Living people
Romanian rhythmic gymnasts
Olympic gymnasts of Romania
Olympic medalists in gymnastics
Olympic silver medalists for Romania
Gymnasts at the 1984 Summer Olympics
Medalists at the 1984 Summer Olympics
Gymnasts from Bucharest